The 1959 Campeonato Profesional (1959 Professional Championship) was the 12th season of Colombia's top-flight football league. 12 teams compete against one another and played each weekend. Millonarios won the league for the 5th time in its history after getting 58 points. Santa Fe, the defending champion, was 8th with 40 points.

Background
Twelve teams competed in the tournament: Deportivo Cali, Independiente Medellín and Unión Magdalena returned, while Atlético Manizales was dissolved. Millonarios won the championship for fifth time.

League system
Every team played four games against each other team, two at home and two away. Teams received two points for a win and one point for a draw. If two or more teams were tied on points, places were determined by goal difference. The team with the most points is the champion of the league.

Teams

Final standings

Results

First turn

Second turn

Top goalscorers

Source: RSSSF.com Colombia 1959

References

External links 
Dimayor Official Page

Prim
Colombia
Categoría Primera A seasons